Annette Rochelle Lee (born 10 July 1992), is a Singaporean singer-songwriter, scriptwriter and YouTube personality. She is known for her short video series on social media such as #ChatsWithChantelle, #AsianParentTings. YouTube shows like Glowing Up and News Plannette. She had previously started out on popular Singaporean social media platform SGAG's comedic videos under the persona "Sue Ann". She released her debut electro-folk EP All Our Achilles Heels in 2017 and Sophomore album Song For The Underdog in 2020.

Early life 
Born in Singapore on 10 July 1992 to parents of Peranakan descent, Lee studied at Saint Andrew's Junior College and graduated from the Nanyang Technological University's School of Art Design and Media.

Career 
Prior to joining SGAG, her short films Keep Mum and Graduation were featured in the Singapore Short Film Awards, Cana Film Festival, Hong Kong International Mobile Film Awards.
 
Lee was first brought to the attention of the SGAG founders from her blog, in which she drew comics and shared stories about her life. She joined SGAG in Feb 2016 to start the video team.

Since 2020, she has left SGAG and now creates her own shows for her own platforms. She also sometimes collaborates with various Singapore Government agencies and organisations like SCDF and Ministry of Health in public service campaigns.

Music 
In September 2017, Lee released her first musical work, an EP titled All Our Achilles Heels. Her album was awarded the National Arts Council presentation grant. In August 2017, Lee released her first music video on YouTube, entitled Ready for a Savior. Her second music video release in March 2018 was titled None Good.

Personal life 
Lee married Raphael in 2017.

Filmography
Films

Music Videos

Discography
EP

References

1992 births
Living people
Nanyang Technological University alumni
21st-century Singaporean women singers
Singaporean singer-songwriters
Singaporean people of Hokkien descent
Cedar Girls' Secondary School alumni
Saint Andrew's Junior College alumni
Peranakan people in Singapore
Singaporean bloggers
Comedy YouTubers
Singaporean Internet celebrities
Singaporean comedy
Singaporean women bloggers
Music YouTubers